I'm Dreaming may refer to:

 I'm Dreaming (album), a 2018 album by Australian electronic musician Alice Ivy
 I'm Dreamin', 1991 number-one R&B single by Christopher Williams